Shinoona Salah Al-Habsi (born 3 July 1993 in Muscat, Oman) is an Omani runner. She competed at the 2012 Summer Olympics in the 100 m event and she was eliminated after the preliminary round.

See also 
 Muslim women in sport

References

External links
 

1993 births
Living people
Omani female sprinters
Olympic athletes of Oman
Athletes (track and field) at the 2012 Summer Olympics
Athletes (track and field) at the 2014 Asian Games
People from Muscat, Oman
Asian Games competitors for Oman